The Waratah Tug and Salvage Company was a tug and salvage company formed in 1931 by the Adelaide Steamship Company. It took over the J. & A. Brown tugs at Newcastle and Sydney.

Citations

Australian ship owners
Shipping companies of Australia
Transport in Sydney
Economy of Newcastle, New South Wales
Companies based in Sydney
Transport companies established in 1931
Australian companies established in 1931
Maritime history of Australia
Adelaide Steamship Company